Joseph Marcel Rejean Paille (December 8, 1932 – October 7, 2002) was an ice hockey goaltender. Born in Shawinigan Falls, Quebec, he was a goaltender in the National Hockey League with the New York Rangers, was a longtime goalie for the Providence Reds of the AHL, played briefly for the Philadelphia Blazers in the World Hockey Association and is the owner of numerous AHL career playoff records.

He died of cancer in Quebec City, Quebec.

Awards and achievements
 QJHL Second All-Star Team (1951, 1952, 1953)
 William Northey Trophy (Top Rookie - QHL) (1956)
 AHL Second All-Star Team (1957, 1960)
 AHL First All-Star Team (1959, 1961, 1962)
 Harry "Hap" Holmes Memorial Award (fewest goals against - AHL) (1961, 1962)
 WHL Second All-Star Team (1964)

Records
 Most AHL Games Played by a Goaltender, Career - 765
 Most AHL Playoff Games Played by a Goaltender, All-Time - 87
 Most AHL Playoff Wins by a Goaltender, All-Time - 49
 Longest AHL Playoff Shutout Streak - 207:27
 Most AHL Playoff Minutes Played, Career - 5,368

References

External links

1932 births
2002 deaths
Baltimore Clippers players
Canadian ice hockey goaltenders
Deaths from cancer in Quebec
Ice hockey people from Quebec
New York Rangers players
Sportspeople from Shawinigan
Philadelphia Blazers players